The Ministry of Home Affairs is part of the Maldivian Executive branch responsible for maintaining law and order in the Maldives at the national level. It was introduced in 1965 after the  Maldivian independence under president Ibrahim Nasir, the second president of Maldives.

Agencies

Maldives police service
Maldives Police Service was first introduced to Maldives under a law established on 29 March 1993 under president Maumoon Abdul Gayoom. The military was incharge to keep law and order before the establishment of the police department. The first police was introduced almost 70 years ago by Muhammad Shamsuddeen III

Maldives correctional service

Maldives correctional service was founded on 31 December 2013 signed into law by president Abdulla Yameen. It is supposed to maintain the jail facilities and make the prisons a safer place for all inmates. It has been part of controversies that they don't give equal treatment for all inmates, though they have denied these claims.

Ministers

See also
 Ministry of Defense (Maldives)
 Ministry of Tourism (Maldives)
 Ministry of Education (Maldives)

References

Politics of the Maldives
Political organisations based in the Maldives
1965 establishments in the Maldives